Shawn Wooden (born October 23, 1973) is a former American football safety who played in the National Football League (NFL) for nine seasons for the Miami Dolphins and the Chicago Bears.  Wooden was drafted in the 6th round by Jimmy Johnson, the then coach of the Miami Dolphins. He played for the Dolphins for four seasons and then signed a free agent contract with the Chicago Bears in the 2000 football season.  After one year with the Chicago Bears, he returned to the Miami Dolphins for the remainder of his career. He is currently a financial advisor with Wooden Wealth Strategies.

Football career
Wooden attended Abington Senior High School, where he played as running back in his senior season. He then accepted a full scholarship to the University of Notre Dame, where he started as a cornerback. One of the highlights of his college career came when he broke up Charlie Ward's final pass, resulting in Notre Dame's (ranked #2 at the time) defeat of the Florida State (ranked #1 at the time) in a nationally televised game in 1993 which was coined at that time the "Game of the Century". As a student-athlete he earned a bachelor's degree in Computer Science. Wooden was drafted in the 1996 NFL draft by the Miami Dolphins in the 6th round. He had a nine-year professional career, playing for the Miami Dolphins and Chicago Bears.

Post-football career
He is well known in the South Florida community for his volunteer work with various charities and organizations. He was forced to retire in 2004 due to a back injury.

References 

1973 births
Living people
Players of American football from Philadelphia
People from Montgomery County, Pennsylvania
American football safeties
Notre Dame Fighting Irish football players
Miami Dolphins players
Chicago Bears players
University of Notre Dame alumni